Avertano Furtado is a Goan politician. He was elected to be the Member of Legislative Assembly of Goa in March 2012 following an election from Navelim constituency after defeating the incumbent Churchill Alemao by 2,000,145 votes.

Early life 
He played soccer for Salgaocar S.C. and MRF as a goalkeeper.

Political career 
Avertano is a social worker in Navelim.

Along with several others and on behalf of the residents of Sinquetim-Navelim he petitioned the Goa High Court to issue a stay order on the construction of the Sinquetim-Benaulim bridge, which was supported by the incumbent MLA Churchill Alemao, on the grounds that the Union Ministry of Environment and Forests had not sanctioned the project and that it would not be recommended until the CRZ clearance is obtained from the ministry.

References

Living people
Goa MLAs 2012–2017
People from South Goa district
Year of birth missing (living people)
Independent politicians in India
Indian National Congress politicians from Goa